"Lowdown / The Latter" is the ninth single released by drum and bass record producer Xample. "Lowdown" reached number one on the UK Dance Singles Chart.

Track listing

Chart performance

Weekly charts

References

2007 songs
2007 singles
Drum and bass songs
RAM Records singles